Anton-Martin Bauer (born 10 September 1963) is an Austrian former equestrian. He competed at the 1996 Summer Olympics and the 2000 Summer Olympics.

References

External links
 

1963 births
Living people
Austrian male equestrians
Olympic equestrians of Austria
Equestrians at the 1996 Summer Olympics
Equestrians at the 2000 Summer Olympics
People from Graz-Umgebung District
Sportspeople from Styria
20th-century Austrian people